Gaétan Carina Alexander Bosiers (born 25 February 1999) is a Belgian professional footballer who plays as a midfielder for Helmond Sport, on loan from Mechelen.

Professional career
Bosiers made his debut for Mechelen in the 2019 Belgian Super Cup, in a 3-0 loss to Genk.

He was sent on a season-long loan to Helmond Sport on 15 August 2020 as part of a new cooperation agreement between Mechelen and Helmond Sport. On 8 June 2021, the loan was extended by one season. On 15 June 2022, Bosiers' loan to Helmond Sport was extended for a third season.

References

External links
 
 Mechelen Profile 
 PSV Profile

1999 births
Living people
People from Wilrijk
Belgian footballers
Belgian expatriate footballers
K.V. Mechelen players
Helmond Sport players
Belgian Pro League players
Eerste Divisie players
Association football midfielders
Belgian expatriate sportspeople in the Netherlands
Expatriate footballers in the Netherlands